Porrhoclubiona diniensis, synonym Clubiona diniensis, is a sac spider species found in Portugal, Spain, France and Germany.

See also 
 List of Clubionidae species

References

External links 

 

Clubionidae
Spiders of Europe
Spiders described in 1878